Chengbei Subdistrict was a subdistrict of Duanzhou District, Zhaoqing, Guangdong, People's Republic of China. , it has 18 residential communities under its administration.

History 
In 2013, Chengbei Subdistrict was abolished by the government of Zhaoqing.

Administrative divisions 
Chengbei Subdistrict had 18 residential communities under its administration.

The following nine residential communities were merged into Chengxi Subdistrict:

 Cuixing Community
 Xinghe Community
 Kanglebei Community
 Duanliu Community
 Duanwu Community
 Denggao Community
 Caochang Community
 Zhongyong Community
 Mumin Community

The following nine residential communities were merged into Chengdong Subdistrict:

 Huayuanhoujie Community
 Shuishiying Community
 Yatu Community
 Gutabei Community
 Lianhu Community
 Duansi Community
 Jingde Community
 Duansan Community
 Heping Community

See also 
 List of township-level divisions of Guangdong

References 

Subdistricts of the People's Republic of China
Township-level divisions of Guangdong